The Hatters is a Russian gypsy-folk-rock band formed in 2016 in St. Petersburg. The members of the group are Yuri Yurievich Muzychenko, Pavel Lichadeev, Alexander "Kikir" Anisimov, Dmitry Vecherinin and Anna Muzychenko.

History 
The group was formed on February 23, 2016, by publishing their first song "Russian Style" on their YouTube channel. On 22 September 2016, the band published the video "I'm Not Easy Buddy" on their YouTube channel. On 17 September and 19 November of the same year, the band gave joint concerts with Little Big and Tatarka in large venues in St. Petersburg and Moscow. On 7 November, they performed with the Emir Kusturica and Gorgan Bregovich On 10 November 2016, the music video for "Russian Style" was published. On 28 December, the group released their first EP "Stay True". In February 2017, the band performed at Krestovsky Stadium as part of the Radio Zenit festival.

On 21 April 2017, the group released their first album "Full Hat". On 26 April, the group performed the song "I'm Not Easy Buddy" on the Russian TV channel "Channel One". On 30 October 2017, they presented a song from their new album "Forever Young, Forever Drunk". The album released on 1 December 2017.

Leader of the band Yuri Muzychenko, was the backing vocals in the Russian Eurovision 2020 song "UNO" by Little Big.

The album "Golden Hits" was released on 3 December 2021.

Musical style 
The band calls themself a "Russian-Gypsy street folk alcoholic hardcore on spiritual instruments".

Band composition

Current composition 
Yuri Muzychenko - vocals, violin (since 2016)
Pavel "Pash-Milash" Lichadeev - vocals, accordion (since 2016)
Alexander "Kikir" Anisimov - bass (since 2016)
Anna Muzychenko - backing vocals, percussion (since 2016)
Dmitry "Milash 2.0" Vecherinin - drums (since 2016)
Daniil Mustaev - Director (since 2016)

Former members 
Anna Lichadeeva (2016-2020) - backing vocals, percussion
Vadim Rulev (2016-2020) - trombone
Altair Kozhakhmetov (2018-2020) - trumpet

Discography

Albums and EPs

Singles

Features

Videography

Music videos

Cameos in other Music Videos

Awards and nominations

References

External links 
YouTube

Spotify

Apple Music

Deezer

Facebook

Instagram

VK

Russian rock music groups
Russian folk rock groups
Folk punk groups
Gypsy punk groups
Ska punk musical groups
2016 establishments in Russia
Russian activists against the 2022 Russian invasion of Ukraine